Maha Samudram is a 2021 Indian Telugu-language romantic action drama film written and directed by Ajay Bhupathi. It is produced by Ramabrahmam Sunkara under AK Entertainments. It stars Sharwanand, Siddharth, Aditi Rao Hydari, and Anu Emmanuel. The music is composed by Chaitan Bharadwaj. The film is set in Visakhapatnam of Andhra Pradesh. The film released on 14 October 2021.

Plot
Vijay and Arjun are thick friends. Vijay, an ambitious civil service aspirant with corrupt plans, is an orphan and has a girlfriend named Mahalakshmi aka Maha, who is a dance teacher. Vijay lives with Arjun and Maha. He is not serious about his relationship with Maha and lives in Arjun's house. Arjun lives with his widowed mother, who praises Vijay for being ambitious and hard-working despite being an orphan, unlike Arjun. Arjun has an uncle Chunchu Mama, who is a fisherman. Unlike Vijay, Arjun plans to start a business from his father's money accumulated before his death. Arjun meets Smitha, who misunderstands him, but realizes her mistake and they start hanging out with each other and fall in love.

One day, Vijay brings Arjun to a factory of illegal drugs and explains that the factory belongs to a smuggler named Dhanunjay, who has a handicapped elder brother Gooni Babji, who created an indestructible crime syndicate. Seeing their smuggling activities, Arjun appreciates Vijay and tells him to start the investigation against them, but Vijay reveals that he joined the police force to become an influential person and involve in illegal activities to earn money. Enraged, Arjun argues with Vijay and has a serious argument. Vijay follows Dhanunjay and ends up in their godown, where he accidentally stabs Dhanunjay. A shocked Vijay meets Arjun and Chunchu, revealing the incident. Chunchu tells him to leave for his safety. Arjun tells him to leave for the railway station and will bring Maha. After they reach, Vijay abandons them. It is revealed that Maha is pregnant with Vijay's child. Arjun brings her to his home, who along with his mother looks after her. Chunchu advises Arjun to be a smuggler to escape Babji's wrath. With much hesitation, Arjun becomes a smuggler and is blamed for Vijay's mistake. Meanwhile, Maha gives birth to a girl and names her Pooja.

Four years later, Arjun becomes the leading smuggler with Chunchu as his right hand. Maha and Pooja live with Arjun and his mother, and Maha does not reveal about Vijay to Pooja. Maha develops feelings for Arjun. Arjun arrives at the court for his case against Babji where he meets Smitha, a successful lawyer, and they start to hang out. Arjun brings Smitha to introduce her to his mother. Seeing Smitha, Maha gets disappointed thinking she wants to marry him. One day, Smitha understands that Maha is in love with Arjun, who tells him to marry Maha for the sake of Maha and Pooja's happiness. Meanwhile, Vijay arrives back to see Maha, where he finds her with Pooja, Arjun, and his mother. When Vijay sees Arjun, Pooja, and Maha together, he misunderstands the situation where he meets Babji and finds out that Dhanunjay has not died, but does not handle their business. 

Babji manipulates Vijay about his friendship with Arjun. Vijay finds out Arjun's location and goes to meet him and asks him about his family, to which Arjun says he does not need to explain to him. A war erupts with Arjun where Vijay joins forces with Babji. He kidnaps Pooja and Chunchu, where Chunchu reveals that Pooja is Vijay's daughter and Arjun became a smuggler due to Vijay's mistakes. Heartbroken from hearing the truth, he frees Chunchu and hugs Pooja. Vijay calls Arjun and tells him that he wants to meet him, not as an enemy but as his old friend, and will hand over Pooja to him. Arjun agrees but meets with an accident caused by Babji and loses consciousness. On the other side, Babji arrives with his henchmen and shoots Vijay after learning that Arjun and Vijay are reconciling together and takes Pooja with them. Arjun regains consciousness and finds Vijay dead. He leaves for Babji's factory and rescues Pooja by killing Babji with Chunchu's help. Arjun, Maha, and Pooja are found on a beach having a good time where Arjun proposes to Maha, to which she accepts wholeheartedly & they live together happily ever after.

Cast

Production 
In 2019, Ajay Bhupati confirmed the film with Bellamkonda Sreenivas in the lead. However, in early 2020, the bilingual film starring Sharwanand and Siddharth is announced. Naga Chaitanya  and Samantha Akkineni were also considered for the lead roles, but it did not materialize.

In October 2020, Aditi Rao Hydari and Anu Emmanuel were cast in the film. Chaitan Bharadwaj who previously composed music for the films such as RX 100 (2018) and SR Kalyanamandapam (2021), was signed for film's soundtrack. After Jabardasth (2013), Siddharth made a straight comeback to Telugu cinema after 8 years. The film was originally intended to be shot simultaneously in Telugu and Tamil languages.  However, the Tamil version was subsequently dropped in favor of a dubbed release.

The principal photography of the film began on 7 December 2020 and wrapped up on 9 July 2021.

Soundtrack 

The songs were composed by Chaitan Bharadwaj.

Release 
The film was initially scheduled to be released on 19 August 2021, but was postponed due to the COVID-19 pandemic. In August 2021, the new release date was announced as 14 October 2021.

References

External links 
 

2021 films
2021 action drama films
2020s Telugu-language films
Indian action drama films
Films set in Andhra Pradesh
Films shot in Andhra Pradesh
Films set in Visakhapatnam
Films shot in Visakhapatnam
Films scored by Chaitan Bharadwaj